Franz Schubert's Impromptus are a series of eight pieces for solo piano composed in 1827. They were published in two sets of four impromptus each: the first two pieces in the first set were published in the composer's lifetime as Op. 90; the second set was published posthumously as Op. 142 in 1839 (with a dedication added by the publisher to Franz Liszt). The third and fourth pieces in the first set were published in 1857 (although the third piece was printed by the publisher in G major, instead of G as Schubert had written it, and remained available only in this key for many years). The two sets are now catalogued as D. 899 and D. 935 respectively. They are considered to be among the most important examples of this popular early 19th-century genre.

Three other unnamed piano compositions (D. 946), written in May 1828, a few months before the composer's death, are known as both "Impromptus" and Klavierstücke ("piano pieces").

The Impromptus are often considered companion pieces to the Six moments musicaux, and they are often recorded and published together.

It has been said that Schubert was deeply influenced in writing these pieces by the Impromptus, Op. 7 (1822) of Jan Václav Voříšek and by the music of Voříšek's teacher Václav Tomášek.

Four Impromptus, D. 899 (Op. 90)

The Opus 90 impromptus consist of four typical Romantic-era pieces, each with distinct elements. The name Impromptus was given by the publisher.

No. 1 in C minor

The first Impromptu, written in C minor, is a set of variations on two themes. It commences with two widely spaced G octaves, leaving the key of the piece ambiguous. The piece continues into a march-like melody played first without accompaniment. The melody is repeated with a chordal accompaniment. (At the end of this statement, the key is revealed: after a rising bass, the C-minor chord is played in root position.) 

The march theme is embellished, then leads slowly into the key of A major, where an apparently new melody is introduced. This melody is actually based on the opening melody: the first three notes are spread out more in their intervals but the following three repeated notes remain. Its lyrical quality, accompanied by triplets in the bass, contrasts with the march quality of the opening. An extension of this melody takes the final turn and repeats it several times in different registers. When the main theme returns for the first time, it has combined with the triplet pattern of the previous section. Later, a new pattern with straight (non-triplet) semiquavers is used as accompaniment, modulating to G minor and then an off-beat version asserts itself in quavers. This theme is based on the second theme, and therefore leads into the extension of the second theme again, this time in G major, using the end of the theme's tonic chord as an effective dominant chord transition into the main theme. The theme gradually dies away and leads to C major, resolving the piece's tension into tranquility. This is the longest impromptu in this set.

No. 2 in E major

Set in E major, the piece begins with a lively scale-based and often chromatic melody in triplets; it is in compound ternary form (the A section is in ternary form itself). The middle subsection of the A section is in E minor and is naturally darker than the opening though still very lyrical. The section ends with two oscillating figures which act as an important bridge both here and later. The first subsection repeats but moves quickly into a codetta which reasserts E minor and the darker feeling of the middle subsection. 

A quick ascending scale leads to the B section in B minor (which however contrasting, is based rhythmically on the implied accents in the structure of the A section (123123123123)). This section is based on a figure alternating a widely spaced bare octave and an offbeat accented triplet. The alternation of octave and triplet becomes closer towards the end and the oscillating figures played at the end of the E minor section return to lead back into the opening A section of the work. The coda is a modified version of the B section, starting in B minor but alternating that key with E minor, in which key the work ends. It is one of few single-movement pieces that begin in a major key and end in the parallel minor (another example being the Rhapsody in E major from Brahms's Four Pieces for Piano, Op. 119).

No. 3 in G major

This serenade is a classic example of Schubert's outstanding lyrical facility, as well as his penchant for long melodic lines. There is little interruption in the fluttering harp-like broken triad accompaniment, creating a tense contrast with the spacious and languid melody—an anticipation of Felix Mendelssohn's Songs Without Words. With no repeats, the melody develops into a shadowy and frequently modulating middle section before returning to its relaxed flow. Though written in G major and  meter (notated by Schubert with a double cut time symbol ), the work was printed by the first publisher, almost 30 years later, in G major and  meter. The original version is now generally preferred.

No. 4 in A major

The fourth Impromptu, in A major, actually begins in A minor, though this is written as A major with accidentals. The opening theme consists of cascading arpeggios followed by murmuring chordal responses. These are repeated and developed, going through C major and B minor before finally reaching A major. There is a subordinate theme, accompanied by the arpeggio, varied with triplets. In the central section, in C minor, the arpeggios are replaced by a chordal accompaniment. This section ventures into the major mode towards its conclusion, but reverts to the minor. The opening section is repeated and the work ends in A major. The tempo marking is allegretto.

Four Impromptus, D. 935 (Op. posth. 142) 

As the first and last pieces in this set are in the same key (F minor), and the set bears some resemblance to a four-movement sonata, it has been suggested that these Impromptus may be a sonata in disguise, notably by Robert Schumann and Alfred Einstein, who claim that Schubert called them Impromptus and allowed them to be individually published to enhance their sales potential. However, this claim has been disputed by contemporary musicologists such as Charles Fisk, who established important differences between the set of Impromptus and Schubert's acknowledged multi-movement works. It is also believed that the set was originally intended to be a continuation of the previous set, as Schubert originally numbered them as Nos. 5–8.

No. 1 in F minor

This Impromptu is written in rondo form, A1–B1–A2–B2–A3. The returning A section appears always in the tonic, F minor; the first B section, B1 is in A major, the relative major, whereas B2 is in the tonic. This structure can also be interpreted as a sonata form without a development section, supporting the view of the four Impromptus as movements of a single sonata. The B episodes contain a passage invoking a unique pianistic effect: the left hand presents short melodic fragments in the form of antecedent and consequent, steadily alternating between the upper (antecedent, creating a crossing of the hands) and lower (consequent) registers of the instrument; the right hand accompanies with an even flow of semiquaver arpeggios in the middle register; the sustain pedal further enriches the sonority, and the dynamics are mostly pianissimo, as often in Schubert's music.

No. 2 in A major

This Impromptu is written in the standard minuet form. Its main section features a melody with chordal accompaniment. The opening bars of the melody are highly reminiscent of a similar theme from the opening of Beethoven's Piano Sonata in A, Opus 26. Alfred Einstein has mentioned another similar theme by Beethoven – in the third movement of the Piano Trio, Op. 70, No. 2. The middle section of the Impromptu, marked Trio as standard in minuets, is contrasted in character with the main section. It is written in D major, and features continuous triplet motion. The second part of the Trio moves to D minor (written in the same key signature but with accidentals added), then climaxes on A major (written without a key signature), fortissimo, and finally calms down and repeats the major-mode first phrase.

No. 3 in B major

This Impromptu in B major is a theme with variations. The main theme resembles a theme from the incidental music that Schubert composed for the play Rosamunde, which also appears in the second movement of his 13th string quartet. The variations follow the classic pattern utilized and developed by Beethoven – elements include increasing subdivision and ornamentation, and a modulation prior to a return to the tonic for the final full variation – see the Arietta of Beethoven's Op. 111, and most prominently, the Diabelli Variations. Like the variations movement in the Trout Quintet, this modulation is achieved by following a tonic-minor variation with one in the flat submediant, following which a brief free passage modulates back to the tonic.

No. 4 in F minor

This Impromptu contains hemiola effects (where two bars of three beats seem to become three bars of two beats), brilliant passagework as well as cross modulations that take this piece to keys not traditionally associated with F minor, such as A minor (for instance, in bar 111), C major (as in bar 142), and A major (bar 165). It is written roughly in rondo form and contains a coda that further heightens the drama in this already intense piece. The work is the most technically demanding of the Impromptus, employing a wide variety of keyboard writing, including scale runs (at times in unison), arpeggios, broken chords, quick passages in thirds, and trills.

Drei Klavierstücke, D. 946

The Drei Klavierstücke D. 946, or "Three Piano Pieces", are solo pieces composed by Schubert in May 1828, just six months before his early death. They were conceived as a third set of four Impromptus, but only three were written. They were first published in 1868, edited by Johannes Brahms, although his name appears nowhere in the publication. In comparison with the D. 899 and D. 935 sets, these works are largely neglected and are not often heard in the concert hall or recorded. There is space for doubts, though, as to whether these pieces actually constitute a cycle or they were arbitrarily united by Brahms (the third piece was written on different paper sheets than the first two even though there were empty sheets after the second one). For the same reasons, the dating of the third piece is rather problematic.

Some musicologists refrain from naming these pieces Impromptus though, since whereas the Impromptus D. 899 and D. 935 tend to be closer to sonata-allegro form, the construction of the pieces D. 946 is different and is rather closer to the Moments musicaux, both in how Schubert treats the inner sections of the pieces and how he introduces second themes.

Pianists who have recorded the pieces include Imogen Cooper on Ottavo and Avie; Noël Lee on Disques Valois; András Schiff on Decca; Claudio Arrau, Alfred Brendel, and Mitsuko Uchida on Philips; Wilhelm Kempff, Maria João Pires, Maurizio Pollini, and Grigory Sokolov on Deutsche Grammophon; Steven Osborne on Hyperion; Sviatoslav Richter on Melodiya; Yulianna Avdeeva on Mirare; Michael Endres on Oehms Classics  and Eliso Virsaladze on Live Classics. Peter Katin, András Schiff and Jos Van Immerseel have recorded them on period (early-nineteenth-century) instruments.

No. 1 in E minor
The main section (allegro assai) is in  time, though, as it is largely in triplets, the effect is like  for much of the time. It soon moves to E major. Schubert crossed out the second, but Brahms included it when editing the first published edition, and it is sometimes played: recordings made by Arrau, Pires, Sokolov and Uchida include the second trio.

No. 2 in E major
This is the most commonly heard of the set and is a highly lyrical piece and very long if all repeats are observed. The first appearance of the main section and both trios are each in two sections, each repeated. The main section is an allegretto in  time. The first trio is in C minor and major (no change in meter or time signature). The second one is in A minor (l'istesso tempo in alla breve time), with modulations to B minor halfway.

No. 3 in C major

The main section exhibits a great deal of syncopation. The trio is in two sections with repeats written out in a varied form. It is in D major and  time with no change in tempo indication. There is a substantial coda, again with syncopation.

Cultural references

Impromptu No. 1 in C minor was featured in the 1975 British–American period drama film Barry Lyndon, which won the Award for Best Musical Score at the 48th Academy Awards for Leonard Rosenman's arrangements of Schubert. This impromptu is also the basis for Patrick Gower's score to the 1982 Alec Guinness miniseries Smiley's People.

The song Questions on the 1976 album The Roaring Silence by progressive rock group Manfred Mann's Earth Band is based on the main theme of Schubert's Impromptu in G major.

In the film Gattaca, an arrangement of the Impromptu in G major, Op. 90, No. 3 by Michael Nyman is played in a concert by a genetically "defective" pianist with twelve fingers. The protagonist, who is genetically defective as well (has myopia, a fragile body, etc.), and is hiding his condition so as not to be discriminated against, is astonished that someone could be accepted and admired despite being defective and says, "Twelve fingers or one, it's how you play." To his dismay his counterpart responds, "That piece can only be played with twelve fingers".

Impromptu No. 2 in E major was performed in its entirety by Françoise Rosay in a segment of the 1948 anthology film Quartet starring Dirk Bogarde and Honor Blackman.

Impromptus Nos 2 (in E major) and 3 (in G major) featured prominently in the 1989 French film Trop Belle Pour Toi, starring Gérard Depardieu.

In the 2002 French film L'homme du train, the old Monsieur Manesquier (played by Jean Rochefort) is more than once depicted playing a part of the Impromptu in A major, Op. 142, No. 2, on his grand piano.

In Howard Jacobson's 2010 Man Booker Prize winning novel The Finkler Question, Impromptu Opus 90 No.3 is referred to as having been played by the character Libor's dead wife Malkie.

Impromptus Nos. 1 and 3, D.899 appeared in Michael Haneke's Palme d'Or winning film Amour. The pieces, played by Alexandre Tharaud, were released in a soundtrack album by EMI Classics.

Impromptus nos. 3 and 4 from the D.899 set were played in the 1996 film of The Portrait of a Lady, from the novel by Henry James.

The Klavierstück no. 2 in E flat major, D. 946, was played in the 1985 film The Shooting Party by Edward Fox's character.

Notes

References

External links

 
Performances of D. 899/1–4, D. 935/1, D. 935/2, D. 935/3, and D. 935/4 by Charlie Albright from the Isabella Stewart Gardner Museum in MP3 format
Introduction to Drei Klavierstücke from Paul Lewis: The Guardian classical music podcast

Piano music by Franz Schubert
Compositions for solo piano
1827 compositions
1828 compositions
Compositions by Franz Schubert published posthumously